General Johannes Jacobus (Jannie) Geldenhuys,  (5 February 1935 – 10 September 2018) was a South African military commander who served as Chief of the South African Defence Force from 1985 to 1990.

Early life
Geldenhuys was born in Kroonstad on 5 February 1935. He would later matriculate from Hoërskool Voortrekker in Bethlehem, Orange Free State.

Military career
He joined the army on 4 January 1954 as a candidate officer. Geldenhuys obtained a BMil from the University of Pretoria in 1956 before joining 1 Special Service Battalion. In 1965, he was based at the South African Embassy in Luanda, Angola as a Vice-Consul, a position he held until 1968. He was appointed as Army Chief of Staff Intelligence and then Army Chief of Staff Operations. He went on to high command in the South African Army, serving as commander of South West Africa Command from 1977 until 1980, when he was briefly appointed as General Officer Commanding the South West African Territorial Force. Later in 1980, he became Chief of the Army. Geldenhuys was promoted to general and assumed the position of Chief of the South African Defence Force on 31 October 1985. In this role, he took part in negotiations that brought the Border War to an end in 1989, after 23 years of fighting.

The post-Apartheid Truth and Reconciliation Commission found that when Geldenhuys and General Ian Gleeson were informed that the SADF and Security Branch had assassinated Dr Fabian Ribeiro and his wife Florence Ribeiro on 1 December 1986 they failed to pass this information onto the Attorney-General or the police. The commission concluded that they both "acted in an obstructive way for which they are legally responsible". As part of the Commission's hearings it was alleged that Geldenhuys had also authorised the use of SADF special forces personnel to support the Security Branch's operations within South Africa; he denied having done so.

Death
Geldenhuys died on 10 September 2018 due to the effects of Alzheimer's disease. He was survived by his wife Marié, daughters Anna-Marié and Lollie, and son Bruwer. Another son, Martin, predeceased him.

Medals and decorations

 
 
 
 
 
 
 
 
 
 Knight 
  Grand Cross of Order Military Merit (Paraguay)
 
  Grand Star of Military Merit (Chile)
   Chilean Grand Officer II Class

References

Further reading

 
 

|-

|-

|-

|-

1935 births
2018 deaths
Afrikaner people
South African people of Dutch descent
Chiefs of the South African Army
South African military personnel of the Border War
People from Kroonstad
Military attachés